Milan Tadić (born 21 February 1970) is a Serbian water polo player. He competed in the men's tournament at the 1996 Summer Olympics.

See also
 Serbia and Montenegro men's Olympic water polo team records and statistics
 List of men's Olympic water polo tournament goalkeepers

References

External links
 

1970 births
Living people
Serbian male water polo players
Serbia and Montenegro male water polo players
Water polo goalkeepers
Olympic water polo players of Yugoslavia
Water polo players at the 1996 Summer Olympics
Place of birth missing (living people)